Area code 904 is the telephone area code in use for most of the First Coast (northeast) region of the state of Florida, including all of the metropolitan area of Jacksonville. It includes all of Duval County, St. Johns County, Nassau County, and Baker County, and almost all of Clay County.

History
The entire state of Florida was originally assigned 305 in 1947. Due to population growth, the southwest portion was split off from 305 in 1953 to form area code 813, and then all of the northern half of Florida, including Jacksonville, was assigned area code 904 in 1965.

This lasted through 1988, when the east coast of Florida from Palm Beach County north through Brevard County, as well as the Orlando metropolitan area was assigned to Area code 407.

In 1995, the area of central Florida surrounding [Ocala] and Gainesville was removed from Area code 904 by the creation of Area code 352. Later in 1995, the Florida Public Service Commission planned a three-way split to relieve the overcrowded 904 Area code. In this plan, the Jacksonville area would move into the proposed Area code 234 while the Daytona Beach LATA would be assigned to Area code 386. The Pensacola, Panama City, and Tallahassee areas would have kept area code 904. As for 234, it was assigned as an overlay to Akron, OH.

Complaints from the public and businesses in the Jacksonville region, as well as opposition from NANPA and the Federal Communications Commission, compelled the Florida PSC to change course and adopt a different plan. The panhandle was assigned to Area code 850, with Jacksonville, Daytona Beach, and the surrounding areas keeping area code 904.

With the advent of cellular telephones, facsimile machines, pocket pagers, and other telephone devices, Area code 904 was projected to use up its available telephone exchanges within four years. Rapid population growth around Jacksonville, Daytona Beach, and the rural areas between Tallahassee and Jacksonville required separate area codes for each. However, when plans were being drawn up for this division, it was discovered that the northwestern portion of the old 904 territory was growing too quickly to stay in 904, even though it was not growing as fast as were the areas closer to Jacksonville. Although this northwestern portion of 904 was not nearly large enough for its own area code, the two nearest area codes, 850 and 352, were growing too quickly to absorb this portion of 904.

This left only three viable solutions - to split the Jacksonville metropolitan area into two area codes, to overlay 904 with a second code (mandating ten-digit dialing, which was a new concept at the time), or make two noncontiguous sections of a new area code. The Florida Public Service Commission, which oversees area code assignments in Florida, opted for the third solution, and these two noncontiguous sections became area code 386 in July 2001.

Currently, 904 is one of the few urban area codes without an overlay, making Jacksonville one of the most-populous U.S. cities where seven-digit dialing is still possible. It is also one of the last area codes to be assigned before the NANP's stable period between 1966 and 1982. Since 904 is projected to exhaust in 2024, a new 324 area code was approved to serve the same geographic boundaries as the 904 area code beginning on February 26, 2024, requiring a transition to ten-digit dialing to take place. An alternative option that was considered was a boundary elimination overlay with 386 (erasing the 2001 split and its non-contiguous area) but that would result in a relatively short period of relief.

See also

List of NANP area codes
List of Florida area codes

External links

 List of exchanges from AreacodeDownload.com, 904 Area code Geico claims

References

Florida's Area code History

904
904
Telecommunications-related introductions in 1965
1965 establishments in Florida